Saju Kodiyan is an Indian mimicry artist, comedian and actor who works in the Malayalam Film Industry. He started his career as a mimicry artist and has acted in more than 20 movies.

TV shows
Cinemala - Asianet
Kadamattathu Kathanar - Asianet (serial)
Culcutta Hospital -Surya TV (serial)
Devimahathmyam - Asianet (serial) 
Cinemaa Chirimaa' - Mazhavil ManoramaAaminatha Speaking – Surya Comedy ChannelSathyam Shivam Sundharam - Amrita TV (serial)Kaiyil Alpam Karyam - Mazhavil ManoramaChayakkoppayile Kodumkattu - Mazhavil ManoramaIm Laughing house - Kerala VisionKudumbavilakku- Asianet (serial) wife is beautiful  - Zee Keralam (serial)
As guestBadai BungalowOnnum Onnum MoonuComedy Super NightCinema CompanyRhythmTalk TalkFamous roles
Saju Kodiyan is famous for his role as Aminathatha in Harisree’s mimicry shows. Saju got the Aminathatha role by chance and his sound blended perfectly with the character. Saju has imitated the former Prime Minister of India, Atal Bihari Vajpayee and it became a super hit. He has also imitated Usha Uthup and still remembers the experience with Usha Didi. During one of their stage shows in Germany, Saju dressed up as Usha Didi and she suddenly meets him who has dressed up like her. She tells him that the makeup was not correct and she herself gives her bindi and ornaments to Saju and set him as a real Usha Uthup.

FilmographyOnnamanThillana Thillana (2003)Campus (2004) (Tamil film)Vamanapuram Bus Route (2004)Kanaka Simhasanam (2006)Novel (2008)Parunthu (2008)Shudharil Shudhan (2009)Pramukhan (2009)Dr. Patient (2009)Bharya Onnu Makkal Moonnu (2009)Swantham Bharya Zindabad (2010)Chekavar (2010)NotOut (2011)Lucky Jokers (2011)Venicile Vyapari (2011)101 Weddings (2012)Sringaravelan (2013) as Narayanan NairMylanchi Monchulla Veedu (2014)Two Countries (2015) as ChellappanPushkaranWelcome to Central Jail (2016)Swarna Kaduva (2016) as Mollykutty's brother Sherlock Toms (2017)
 Aakasha Ganga 2'' (2019)

Writer
 Lucky Jokers

External links
Youtube channel link

Living people
Male actors from Kochi
Indian male film actors
Indian male television actors
Male actors in Malayalam television
People from Aluva
21st-century Indian male actors
Year of birth missing (living people)